Vele Mune is a village in the Primorje-Gorski Kotar County, Croatia. Administratively it belongs to the municipality of Matulji.

Population

See also 
 Male Mune

References 

Populated places in Primorje-Gorski Kotar County